The Big Town may refer to:

 The Big Town (1925 film), a 1925 film
 The Big Town (1987 film), a 1987 film
 Big Town (film), a 1947 American crime film
 Big Town, a radio drama series, later adapted to film and television and a comic book
 "Big Town" (The Big Dish song), 1990
 "Big Town", a song by OMD from the album Sugar Tax
Big Town (TV series), 1955 American TV series